Mohamed Bendahmane (born 29 June 1958) is an Algerian swimmer. He competed in the men's 4 × 200 metre freestyle relay at the 1980 Summer Olympics.

References

External links
 

1958 births
Living people
Olympic swimmers of Algeria
Swimmers at the 1980 Summer Olympics
Place of birth missing (living people)
Algerian male freestyle swimmers
20th-century Algerian people